FC Sinimustat (abbreviated Sinimustat) is a football club from Turku in Finland.  The club was formed in 2007 and their home ground is at the Yläkenttä, Kupittaa.  Sinimustat is FC Inter Turku's  'B team' which currently plays in the Kakkonen, or the third level of football in Finland. The Chairman of Inter Turku is Stefan Håkans.

History
FC Sinimusta is a very new team having been established in 2007 as a reserve and development team for the Veikkausliiga club, FC Inter Turku.   Sinimusta were fortunate to begin their competitive football life in 2008 in Group B of the Kakkonen (Second Division) by taking the place of VG-62 Naantali who previously operated as FC Inter's second string. Founder members of the team included footballers Magnus Bahne and Ari Nyman as well as FC Inter's chairman Stefan Håkans. Sinimusta translates as Blue-Black, the colours of FC Inter.

Sinimusta are now in their third season in the Kakkonen (Second Division), the third tier of Finnish football from 2008 to the present day.  Both the 2008 and 2009 seasons has seen the team finish in eleventh position just above the relegation places.

Season to season

Club Structure
Sinimustat is part of the FC Inter Turku structure which has 3 men's teams and 10 boys teams. In addition there is the Inter Akatemia which provides gifted juniors with the optimum conditions for training before moving to a League team or overseas.

2010 season
 Sinimustat  are competing in Group B (Lohko B) of the Kakkonen administered by the Football Association of Finland  (Suomen Palloliitto) .  This is the third highest tier in the Finnish football system.  In 2009 FC Sinimustat finished in eleventh position in their Kakkonen section.

References and sources
Official FC Inter Website
Finnish Wikipedia
Suomen Cup

Footnotes

Football clubs in Finland
Sport in Turku
2007 establishments in Finland